Ingrid de Kok aka Ingrid Fiske (born 1951) is a South African author and poet.

Biography 
Ingrid de Kok grew up in Stilfontein, a gold mining town in what was then the Western Transvaal. When she was 12 years old, her parents moved to Johannesburg. In 1977, she emigrated to Canada where she lived until returning to South Africa in 1984. She has one child, a son. Her partner is Tony Morphet.

De Kok is a fellow of the University of Cape Town, an Associate Professor in Extra-Mural Studies, and part of a team of two that designs and administers the public non-formal educational curriculum that constitutes the Extra-Mural Programmes at the University of Cape Town. She has also designed and co-ordinated national colloquiums and cultural programmes, such as one on Technology and Reconstruction and on Equal Opportunity Policy, and At the Fault Line: Cultural Inquiries into Truth and Reconciliation. She runs various capacity building, civic and trade union programmes, and alternates in the role of Director.

She is very well known for being the writer of the poem, "Our Sharpeville", which is a poem about police opening fire on a peaceful protest killing 50 black men. She has also co-ordinated schools and public programmes devoted to the development of a reading culture. She is a member of PEN, South Africa and a Trustee of Buchu Publishing Project. She was a member of the committee of the National Arts Festival in Grahamstown, South Africa with responsibility for convening the Winter School from 2000 to 2005, and is currently on the National Arts Council Literary Advisory Committee. She is the chair of the South African Association of Canadian Studies.

Between 1977 and 2006, de Kok's poems were published in numerous South African literary journals, including Upstream, Sesame, Staffrider, Contrast, New Contrast, New Coin, and Carapace. Occasionally poems have also appeared, translated into Afrikaans, in various South African Afrikaans newspapers.

Works 
 Familiar Ground, Johannesburg: Ravan Press, 1988, .
 Transfer, Cape Town: Snail Press, 1997, .
 Terrestrial Things, Cape Town: Kwela/SnailPress, 2002, .
 Seasonal Fires: Selected and New Poems, NYC: Seven Stories Press, 2006, .
 Seasonal Fires: Selected and New Poems, South Africa: Umuzi, Random House, 2006, .
 Mappe del corpo, A cura di Paola Splendore. Rome: Donzelli Poesia, 2008, .

References

External links 

 Ingrid de Kok
 Africa - Poetry International Web 
  Umuzi Publishing

1951 births
Living people
South African people of Dutch descent
Afrikaner people
South African women poets
South African women writers